The 2000 Welsh Labour leadership election was held following the resignation of Alun Michael as First Secretary of Wales and Leader of Welsh Labour.

Candidates

Rhodri Morgan, Welsh Assembly Member since 1999 and Member of Parliament since 1987 for Cardiff West.

Result

Morgan was the only nominated candidate and was unanimously elected at a meeting of the Welsh Labour Party’s executive committee and Labour Assembly Members.

References

2000
2000 in Wales
Welsh Labour leadership election